Zhao Shoushan (12 November 1894 – 20 June 1965) was a KMT general and later Chinese Communist Party politician. He is the grandfather of Zhao Leji.

Career
Zhao Shoushan was born in Hu County, Shaanxi in 1894. After the foundation of the People's Republic of China, Zhao was the CCP Chairman of Qinghai and Governor of Shaanxi.

External links
 Biography of Zhao Shoushan, Shaanxi Daily July 9, 2006.

1894 births
1965 deaths
Governors of Qinghai
Governors of Shaanxi
National Revolutionary Army generals from Shaanxi
Politicians from Xi'an
People's Republic of China politicians from Shaanxi
Chinese Communist Party politicians from Shaanxi
Republic of China politicians from Shaanxi